Bickerstaffe is a village and civil parish in the West Lancashire district of Lancashire, England. According to the 2001 Census the population of the civil parish was 1,196, reducing to 1,180 at the 2011 census, although the population of the electoral ward, which includes Lathom South, was slightly greater at 2,013, reducing to 1,988 at the 2011 census. 
The village is near junction 3 of the M58 motorway, and is about four miles west of Skelmersdale.

History
Its name may come from Anglo-Saxon bïcera stæþ = "the beekeepers' landing-place".

The current hall may date to 1667 and was built for a member of the Stanley family, however it was re-built or heavily modified in 1772.

Bickerstaffe Stocks are one of the listed structures of historical importance in the village.

In the seventeenth century, Bickerstaffe was an important local centre of the Quakers in West Lancashire.

The parish church is dedicated to the Holy Trinity. Being built in 1843, and then extended in 1860, with a bell tower and spire to the west. It was designed by architect Sydney Smirke, with multiple examples of fine masonry. Such as the carved angles above the doorway, as well as royal heads carved into the accent stones either side of each of the northern and western windows.

Until October 1936 Bickerstaffe Colliery was located just south of M6 junction 3.

2012 saw the start of United Utilities £63m scheme at Bickerstaffe Water Treatment works to reduce the reliance of the local water supply on the River Dee. That initiative comes in two parts: drilling new boreholes to find new water sources, and extending Bickerstaffe Water Treatment Works to cope with the rising demand for water.

Sport
The grounds of Bickerstaffe AFC are at Hall Lane next to Bickerstaffe C.E school.

Culture
Public houses and restaurants in the area include The Stanley Gate, The Sandpipers and Quattros.

An annual music festival, Bickerstock, takes place in the summer season, featuring local and international artists, and drawing in increasingly large crowds.

Notable people
 Nicholas Atherton

See also

Listed buildings in Bickerstaffe
Scheduled monuments in Lancashire

References

External links

 
Villages in Lancashire
Civil parishes in Lancashire
Geography of the Borough of West Lancashire
Stanley family